Selknamia is a genus of South American anyphaenid sac spiders containing the single species, Selknamia minima. It was  first described by M. J. Ramírez in 2003, and has only been found in Chile and Argentina.

References

Anyphaenidae
Monotypic Araneomorphae genera
Spiders of South America